A Conversation with Gregory Peck is a 1999 American documentary film directed by Barbara Kopple.

Kopple followed Peck as he embarked on a live speaking tour throughout the United States reflecting on his life and career. The film also looks at Peck's home life with his family, as well as his public appearances where he meets such notable individuals as then President of the United States Bill Clinton, then French President Jacques Chirac, and filmmaker Martin Scorsese.

A Conversation with Gregory Peck was part of the PBS documentary series American Masters and was screened out of competition at the 2000 Cannes Film Festival. It is featured on a 2005 2-disc collector's edition of To Kill a Mockingbird.

Cast
 Gregory Peck
 Lauren Bacall
 Mary Badham
 Jacques Chirac
 Bill Clinton
 Hillary Clinton
 Martin Scorsese
 Veronique Passani
 Anthony Peck
 Carey Paul Peck
 Cecilia Peck
 Don Peck
 Steve Peck
 Zack Peck
 Daniel Voll

References

External links

 Cabin Creek Films - Barbara Kopple's Production Company
 Gregory Peck Online - A Comprehensive Gregory Peck Fansite

1999 films
Documentary films about actors
Films directed by Barbara Kopple
American documentary films
1999 documentary films
American Masters films
1990s English-language films
1990s American films